A citizen’s right to a trial by jury is a central feature of the United States Constitution. It is considered a fundamental principle of the American legal system.

Laws and regulations governing jury selection and conviction/acquittal requirements vary from state to state (and are not available in courts of American Samoa), but the fundamental right itself is mentioned five times in the Constitution: Once in the original text (Article III, Section 2) and four times in the Bill of Rights (in the Fifth, the Sixth, and the Seventh Amendments).

The American system utilizes three types of juries: Investigative grand juries, charged with determining whether enough evidence exists to warrant a criminal indictment; petit juries (also known as a trial jury), which listen to the evidence presented during the course of a criminal trial and are charged with determining the guilt or innocence of the accused party; and civil juries, which are charged with evaluating civil lawsuits.

The most outstanding feature of the U.S. system is that convictions (but not necessarily acquittals) in serious criminal cases must be unanimous, which the Supreme Court of the United States affirmed to be a constitutional guarantee in Ramos v. Louisiana (2020).

History
The U.S. Declaration of Independence accused George III of "depriving us in many cases, of the benefits of trial by jury."

Article III of the U.S. Constitution states that all trials shall be by jury. The right was expanded with the Sixth Amendment to the United States Constitution, which states in part, "In all criminal prosecutions, the accused shall enjoy the right to a speedy and public trial, by an impartial jury of the state and district wherein the crime shall have been committed," and the Seventh Amendment to the United States Constitution, which guarantees a jury trial in civil cases.

The U.S. Supreme Court noted the importance of the jury right in its 1968 ruling of Duncan v. Louisiana:

Those who wrote our constitutions knew from history and experience that it was necessary to protect against unfounded criminal charges brought to eliminate enemies and against judges too responsive to the voice of higher authority. The framers of the constitutions strove to create an independent judiciary but insisted upon further protection against arbitrary action. Providing an accused with the right trial by a jury of his peers gave him an inestimable safeguard against the corrupt or overzealous prosecutor and against the compliant, biased, or eccentric judge.

Women in United States juries

The representation of women in United States juries has increased during the last hundred years, due to legislation and court rulings. Up until the late twentieth century, women were routinely excluded or allowed to opt out from jury service. The push for women's jury rights generated debate similar to the women's suffrage movement, permeating the media with arguments for and against. Federal and state court case rulings increased women's participation on juries. Some states allowed women to serve on juries much earlier than others. States also differed on whether women's suffrage implied women's jury service.

Federal jury
A federal jury, in the United States, is impaneled to try federal civil cases and to indict and try those accused by United States Attorneys of federal crimes. A federal grand jury consists of 16 to 23 members and requires the concurrence of 12 in order to indict. A federal petit jury consists of 12 members and the verdict must be unanimous.

Federal jury trial rights

Criminal juries

Grand jury
A grand jury decides whether or not there is enough evidence ("probable cause") that a person has committed a crime in order to put him or her on trial. If a grand jury decides there is enough evidence, the person is indicted.  A grand jury has 16-23 members, and its proceedings are not open to the public. Unlike a petit jury, defendants and their attorneys do not have the right to appear before the grand jury.

Petit jury
A petit jury, also known as a trial jury, is the standard type of jury used in criminal cases in the United States. Petit juries are responsible for deciding whether or not a defendant is guilty of violating the law in a specific case. They consist of 6-12 people and their deliberations are private. Their decision is known as a verdict and decides whether a person is guilty or not guilty.

Scope of constitutional right
Currently in the United States every person accused of a crime punishable by incarceration for more than six months has a constitutional right to a trial by jury, which arises in federal court from the Sixth Amendment, the Seventh Amendment, and Article Three of the United States Constitution, which states in part, "The Trial of all Crimes ... shall be by Jury; and such Trial shall be held in the State where the said Crimes shall have been committed". Most states' constitutions also grant the right of trial by jury in lesser criminal matters, though most have eliminated that right in offenses punishable by fine only.  The Supreme Court has ruled that if imprisonment is for six months or less, trial by jury is not required, meaning a state may choose whether or not to permit trial by jury in such cases.

Specifically, the Supreme Court has held that no offense can be deemed 'petty' for purposes of the right to trial by jury where imprisonment for more than six months is authorized. Justice Black and Justice Douglas concurred, stating that they would have required a jury trial in all criminal proceedings in which the sanction imposed bears the indicia of criminal punishment. Chief Justice Burger, Justice Harlan and Justice Stewart objected to setting this limitation at six months for the States, preferring to give them greater leeway. No jury trial was required when the trial judge suspended sentence and placed defendant on probation for three years. There is a presumption that offenses carrying maximum imprisonment of six months or less are petty, although it is possible that such long an offense could be pushed into the serious category if the legislature tacks on onerous penalties not involving incarceration. No jury trial is required, however, when the maximum sentence is six months in jail, a fine not to exceed $1,000, a 90-day driver's license suspension, and attendance at an alcohol use disorder education course. The Supreme Court found that the disadvantages of such a sentence, "onerous though they may be, may be outweighed by the benefits that result from speedy and inexpensive nonjury adjudications." Such interpretations have been criticized on the grounds that "all" is not a word that constitution-makers use lightly.

In the case of traffic offenses punishable by fine only (including parking tickets), and misdemeanor charges providing for imprisonment of six months or less, the availability of trial by jury varies from state to state, usually providing only for bench trials.  The three exceptions are Texas, Vermont, and Virginia, which provide the defendant with the right to a jury trial in all cases, which means if one is willing to pay the cost in case of a loss, one may even obtain a jury trial for a parking ticket in those states.  In Virginia, one wanting a jury trial on a minor misdemeanor or traffic offense would actually have a right to two trials if they wanted a jury trial on the issue, first by bench trial only in District court, and then, if they lost, to a trial de novo in Circuit court, this time with a jury if they chose to do so.  Similarly, in Texas, fine-only misdemeanor offenses tried first in a court not of record (Justice of the Peace courts or municipal courts without a court reporter) may be appealed to a trial de novo in county court.

Many juvenile court systems do not recognize a right to a jury trial, on the grounds that juvenile proceedings are civil rather than criminal, and that jury trials would cause the process to become adversarial.

Sentencing
In the cases Apprendi v. New Jersey, and Blakely v. Washington, the Supreme Court of the United States held that a criminal defendant has a right to a jury trial not only on the question of guilt or innocence, but any fact used to increase the defendant's sentence beyond the maximum otherwise allowed by statutes or sentencing guidelines. This invalidated the procedure in many states and the federal courts that allowed sentencing enhancement based on "a preponderance of evidence", where enhancement could be based on the judge's findings alone. Depending upon the state a jury must be unanimous for either a guilty or not guilty decision. In the event of a hung jury, charges against the defendant are not dropped and can be reinstated if the state so chooses. In the federal system, a unanimous verdict is required.  Additionally, in April 2020, the Supreme Court of the United States ruled in Ramos v. Louisiana that for felony convictions or more severe charges, the jury's verdict for conviction must be unanimous, overriding the only state, Oregon, that had allowed non-unanimous decisions at this point (Louisiana removed this allowance through a 2018 constitutional amendment).

Waiver
The vast majority of U.S. criminal cases are not concluded with a jury verdict, but rather by plea bargain. Both prosecutors and defendants often have a strong interest in resolving the criminal case by negotiation resulting in a plea bargain. If the defendant waives a jury trial, a bench trial is held. Research indicates there is not a consistent difference between penalties handed down in jury trials and those handed down in bench trials.

In United States Federal courts, there is no absolute right to waive a jury trial. Per Federal Rule of Criminal Procedure 23(a), only if the prosecution and the court consent may a defendant have a waiver of jury trial. However, most states give the defendant the absolute right to waive a jury trial.  In those states, the right to a jury trial belongs exclusively to the criminal defendant, and the prosecution cannot obtain a jury trial if the defendant has validly waived their right to one. In Patton v. United States, one of the jurors became incapacitated and counsel for the defendant and the government agreed to continue with 11 jurors. The U.S. Supreme Court ruled that this was acceptable if the prosecution and the court, as well as the defendant, agreed to this procedure.

Civil juries

Seventh Amendment

The right to trial by jury in a civil case is addressed by the 7th Amendment, which provides: "In Suits at common law, where the value in controversy shall exceed twenty dollars, the right of trial by jury shall be preserved, and no fact tried by a jury shall be otherwise re-examined in any Court of the United States, than according to the rules of the common law." Although the civil jury (unlike the criminal jury) has fallen into disuse in much of the rest of the world, including England, it remains in high esteem in the United States. In Joseph Story's 1833 treatise Commentaries on the Constitution of the United States, he wrote, "[I]t is a most important and valuable amendment; and places upon the high ground of constitutional right the inestimable privilege of a trial by jury in civil cases, a privilege scarcely inferior to that in criminal cases, which is conceded by all to be essential to political and civil liberty." Nearly every state constitution contains a similar guarantee.

The 7th Amendment does not create any right to a jury trial; rather, it "preserves" the right to jury trial that existed in 1791 at common law. In this context, common law means the legal environment the United States inherited from England at the time. In England in 1791, civil actions were divided into actions at law and actions in equity. Actions at law had a right to a jury, actions in equity did not.

The decision in Rachal v. Hill, indicated that 7th Amendment right to jury trial may severely limit developments in the principles of res judicata. Some critics believe that the United States has more trial by jury than is necessary or desirable.

The right to a jury trial is determined based upon the a demand in the complaint brought by a Plaintiff, without regard to the defenses or counterclaims asserted by a defendant.

The right to a jury trial in civil cases does not extend to the states, except when a state court is enforcing a federally created right, of which the right to trial by jury is a substantial part.

It has been suggested that in complex litigation, the jury's inability to comprehend the issues may cause the 7th Amendment right to conflict with due process rights and authorize the judge to strike the jury.

The right to trial by jury in bankruptcy cases has been described as unclear.

In Colgrove v. Battin, the Supreme Court held that a civil jury of six members did not violate the Seventh Amendment right to trial by jury in a civil case.

Federal Rules of Civil Procedure
Federal Rules of Civil Procedure Rule 2 says "[t]here is one form of action - the civil action[,]" which abolishes the legal/equity distinction. Today, in actions that would have been "at law" in 1791, there is a right to a jury; in actions that would have been "in equity" in 1791, there is no right to a jury. However, Federal Rule of Civil Procedure 39(c) allows a court to use one at its discretion. To determine whether the action would have been legal or equitable in 1791, one must first look at the type of action and whether such an action was considered "legal" or "equitable" in 1791. Next, the relief being sought must be examined. Monetary damages alone were purely a legal remedy, and thus entitled to a jury. Non-monetary remedies such as injunctions, rescission, and specific performance were all equitable remedies, and thus up to the judge's discretion, not a jury. In Beacon Theaters v. Westover, the U.S. Supreme Court discussed the right to a jury, holding that when both equitable and legal claims are brought, the right to a jury trial still exists for the legal claim, which would be decided by a jury before the judge ruled on the equitable claim.

Following the English tradition, U.S. juries have usually been composed of 12 jurors, and the jury's verdict has usually been required to be unanimous. However, in many jurisdictions, the number of jurors is often reduced to a lesser number (such as five or six) by legislative enactment, or by agreement of both sides. Some jurisdictions also permit a verdict to be returned despite the dissent of one, two, or three jurors. Federal Rule of Civil Procedure 48 states that a federal civil jury must begin with at least 6 and no more than 12 members, and that the verdict must be unanimous unless the parties stipulate otherwise.

Waiver
Alternative dispute resolution is becoming increasingly common. Mandatory binding arbitration has been used by some parties to prevent the 7th Amendment right to a civil jury trial from being invoked. Arbitration agreements are becoming increasingly common in the marketplace, to the point at which it is becoming difficult for consumers to purchase products without waiving their right to settle disputes arising out of the transaction by jury trial. It has been argued that arbitration clauses should be held to a higher "knowing-consent" standard in order to be upheld.

Jury selection

Jurors in some states are selected through voter registration and drivers' license lists.  A form is sent to prospective jurors to pre-qualify them by asking the recipient to answer questions about citizenship, disabilities, ability to understand the English language, and whether they have any conditions that would excuse them from being a juror.  If they are deemed qualified, a summons is issued. In the federal system, jurors are selected in accordance with the Jury Selection Act.

Criticism

It has been proposed that the federal civil jury system be abolished in order to clean up the backlog of cases, keep court calendars current, and obtain better and more efficient administration of justice. Research indicates that while civil trials may proceed more slowly before a jury, judge-tried cases last longer on the docket.

Proposals to abolish the jury system have been criticized on the grounds that only reform, not abolition, is necessary; and that there is no better alternative system. Juror ignorance has been described as a potential threat to justice; for instance, one study found that 50% of jurors surveyed thought that it was up to the defendant to prove his innocence. The growing use of administrative procedures and of the contempt power to enforce law has been cited as evidence that trial by jury is facing a period of critical re-examination.

Some legal journals have speculated that jury trials encourage harsh punishment in the United States.

References